Rossington was a railway station which served the village of Rossington on the Great Northern Railway's main line some  south of Doncaster.It closed for regular passenger services in 1958 but was occasionally served by special trains until the mid-1960s.

History 
The station was set slightly west of the old village alongside the main road, from which access was gained, but on the building of the colliery village, known as New Rossington, to the west of the main line the station gained a whole new passenger base including miners travelling to work and home again, particularly before the colliery village was complete.

The station, with two flanking platforms, was set just south of the colliery junction.

Present day 
A new station at Rossington was suggested in a report to Doncaster Borough Council and with respect to this land was secured and reserved for the car park and approaches.

In September 2008 a report was submitted to Doncaster Borough Council on the strategy for prospective future rail corridors and stations in the area.

References 

Disused railway stations in Doncaster
Railway stations in Great Britain opened in 1849
Railway stations in Great Britain closed in 1958
1849 establishments in England
Former Great Northern Railway stations